Adelheid Seeck (3 November 1912 – 17 February 1973) was a German film actress. She appeared in 27 films between 1941 and 1972. She starred in The Last Ones Shall Be First, which was entered into the 7th Berlin International Film Festival.

Selected filmography
 The Noltenius Brothers (1945)
 Where the Trains Go (1949)
 Three Girls Spinning (1950)
 The Day Before the Wedding (1952)
 Once I Will Return (1953)
 Ripening Youth (1955)
 Anastasia: The Czar's Last Daughter (1956)
 Devil in Silk (1956)
 The Last Ones Shall Be First (1957)
 Mädchen in Uniform (1958)
 The Rest Is Silence (1959)
 The Last Witness (1960)
 My Husband, the Economic Miracle (1961)
 Waiting Room to the Beyond (1964)

References

External links

1912 births
1973 deaths
German film actresses
Actresses from Berlin
20th-century German actresses